Things called Wood Street:

England
 Wood Street, London - a street in the City of London, England
 Wood Street Counter - a small prison in the City of London, destroyed in 1666
 Wood Street railway station - a station in Walthamstow, London
 Wood Street, Bath - Bath, Somerset, England
 Wood Street Village - a village in Surrey, England 
 Wood Street Mission - a children's charity in Manchester city centre

United States
 Wood Street (PAT station) - a light rail station in Pittsburgh, Pennsylvania
 Wood Street Galleries - contemporary art gallery above the station